Gürgencik (Laz language: K'op'tone) is a village in the Arhavi District, Artvin Province, Turkey. Its population is 44 (2021).

References

Villages in Arhavi District
Laz settlements in Turkey